State Highway 56 (SH 56) is a state highway Grayson and Fannin counties in north-central Texas, United States. This highway was designated in 1974 to replace U.S. Highway 82 (US 82) when it was rerouted north of Whitesboro and Sherman. SH 56 has been extended further since then as the US 82 bypass continued to be extended north of Bonham and Honey Grove.

Through Sherman, SH 56 operates on a pair of one-way streets, Lamar (eastbound) and Houston (westbound).

Route description
SH 56 begins at an intersection with US 82 just outside of Whitesboro. The highway then enters Whitesboro with indirect access to US 377. SH 56 next travels through Southmayd, where it meets SH 289, before entering Sherman. Just east of Farm to Market Road 1417 (FM 1417), the highway splits into a pair of one–way streets, with eastbound traffic traveling on Lamar Street and westbound on Houston Street. SH 56 meets US 75 before entering downtown Sherman. The highway merges back into one street, just before SH 11 before leaving Sherman. SH 56 runs through a generally undeveloped area of Grayson County before entering Bells, where the highway meets US 69. Between Bells and Savoy, SH 56 enters Fannin County. The highway runs through Ector, before entering Bonham where it meets SH 121 and SH 78. SH 56 runs through Dodd City, Windom and Honey Grove before ending at an intersection with US 82.

History

SH 56 was originally designated on August 21, 1923, through the northwestern Panhandle, replacing SH 5D. Construction was completed by September 26, 1939, when the SH 56 designation was dropped in favor of US 54. SH 56 was designated on April 7, 1974, from US 82 southeast to FM 1417. On August 26, 1993, SH 56 was extended east to US 82 at the Lamar County line, its current terminus. Parts were concurrent with US 82 until the US 82 bypass opened.

Major intersections

See also

 List of state highways in Texas
 List of highways numbered 56

References

External links

056
U.S. Route 54
U.S. Route 82
Transportation in Grayson County, Texas
Transportation in Fannin County, Texas